Kevin Canady (born June 24, 1969) is an American professional wrestler better known by his ring name Mad Man Pondo. Best known for his hardcore wrestling style, Canady has wrestled for various wrestling promotions, including Independent Wrestling Association Mid-South, Combat Zone Wrestling, Big Japan Pro Wrestling, and Juggalo Championship Wrestling. He is also the owner of IWA East Coast, and is currently employed by Juggalo Championship Wrestling.

In his professional wrestling career, Canady is a five-time Heavyweight champion having won the IWA Mid-South Heavyweight Championship once, JCW Heavyweight Championship twice, the XCW Pro Wrestling Heavyweight Championship once, and MPW Heavyweight Championship once. In addition to these championships, he has won the CZW Iron Man Championship once, IWA Mid-South Hardcore Championship twice, IWA Mid-South Tag Team Championship once with Ian Rotten, and JCW Tag Team Championship twice with Necro Butcher. Canady is also the 2003 IWA Mid-South King of the Deathmatch Tournament winner and 2006 IWA Mid-South Double Death Tag Team Tournament winner with 2 Tuff Tony.

Professional wrestling career

Early career
Canady began his professional wrestling career in 1989 at the age of 20. Initially performing as a traditional professional wrestler, Canady realized that he would not become a nationally recognized talent. He noticed that his friends were in awe while watching wrestling tapes of death matches, and soon adopted the same hardcore style himself. He created his ring name Mad Man Pondo as a play on Abdullah the Butcher's nickname the "Mad Man from Sudan" and the character Pondo Sinatra from The Party Animal. He and fellow wrestlers Corporal Robinson and 2 Tuff Tony began traveling throughout the country together early in their careers. Video distribution company Smart Mark Video helped the trio gain national exposure.

IWA Mid-South
Canady began working for Independent Wrestling Association Mid-South (IWA-MS) in 1997. In 1999, he volunteered to get into a rivalry with 2 Tuff Tony to help introduce him to the hardcore wrestling style of the company. Pondo acquainted him to the proper techniques of hardcore wrestling, and Tony later recalled that Pondo "took good care of me" in their matches. On April 15, Canady became the first IWA Mid-South Hardcore Champion. He lost the title to Tony two weeks later before winning it back the following month. Canady lost the championship to Tony the next day, but won the IWA Mid-South Heavyweight Championship that September.

In 2003, he participated in the King of the Deathmatch Tournament. Canady defeated Nate Webb, Axl Rotten, then Nick Gage to make it to the finals. In the final match, he defeated J.C. Bailey to be crowned the 2003 King of the Deathmatch. On March 18, 2006, Canady and Ian Rotten defeated Iron Saints to become the IWA Mid-South Tag Team Championship. The duo lost the championship five months later. That November, Canady and 2 Tuff Tony took part in the first Double Death Tag Team Tournament, though they weren't told which team would win the tournament. They defeated Children of Pain then Dysfunction and Corporal Robinson to make it to the finals. In the finals, he and Tony defeated Tough Crazy Bastards to be crowned the first Double Death Tag Team Tournament champions.

He later went on and lost in the second round of the 2008 King of the Deathmatch Tournament.

Juggalo Championship Wrestling (1999–present)
In 1997, Canady wrestled for Insane Clown Posse at the event ICP's Strangle-Mania Live. Two years later, he, 2 Tuff Tony, and Corporal Robinson wrestled at the Dan Curtis Memorial, an independent wrestling booker who had recently worked for Insane Clown Posse. Several days after the event, Tony, Robinson, and Canady were booked to wrestle for Insane Clown Posse's first Juggalo Championship Wrestling show. Canady teamed with Pete Madden to defeat Ian Rotten and Corporal Robinson in an Exploding Barbwire match.

The following year, Canady participated in the "Strangle-Mania Live Tour". His Hardcore match with Fat Fuck Barrel Boy was put on JCW, Vol. 2. Canady began appearing every year at the annual Gathering of the Juggalos and quickly became a staple in the company. In 2003, he and Necro Butcher fought in a deathmatch which was released on JCW, Vol. 3. Soon after, the two men began teaming together. At the 2005 Gathering of the Juggalos, Canaday defeated champion Terry Funk to become JCW Heavyweight Champion. He held the title for over a year before losing it to Corporal Robinson at the Hallowicked After Party 2006.

The following year, Canady went on tour with JCW to film the internet wrestling show SlamTV!. On the first episode, Insane Clown Posse announced that the JCW Tag Team Championship had been vacated, which caused several tag teams to emerge. Canady aligned himself with Necro Butcher, and the team dominated competition for several weeks. However, animosity grew between the two as miscommunication cost both members multiple matches. The following weeks saw the duo break out into fist fights, which led to a series of matches between them. The team reunited at "East Side Wars", though, and eventually established themselves as top contenders for the vacant tag team title. At Bloodymania, the duo won an 8 Team Tag-Team Elimination match to become the new JCW Tag Team Champions. The reign was short lived, however, as Necro Butcher signed a contract with Ring of Honor, forcing Canady to team with several partners. At a live event in Cleveland, Ohio on January 26, 2008, Canady and his partner Breyer Wellington lost the title to 2 Tuff Tony and Violent J.

Canady also wrestled at both Bloodymania II and Bloodymania III in singles matches. At Big Ballas X-Mas Party 2009, Canady and Necro teamed up again to face the Thomaselli Brothers. On May 22, 2010, while touring with JCW on Insane Clown Posse's "Happy Daze Tour," Pondo defeated Corporal Robinson to become a two-time JCW Heavyweight Champion. In a rematch nine days later, Pondo lost the championship to Robinson in a Four Corners of Pain match. At Bloodymania IV, Canady and Necro Butcher lost to the team of Balls Mahoney and Hollywood Chuck Hogan.

On March 9, 2011, at Hardcore Hell, the team of Pondo and Necro Butcher defeated The Haters in a hardcore Barbed Wire, Thumbtacks, and Ladders match for their second JCW Tag Team Championship.  The duo lost their championship to Ring Rydas the following month.

Combat Zone Wrestling (2000–2008)
At Bloodbath 2000, Canady and Ian Rotten wrestled to a draw in his debut match in Combat Zone Wrestling. He continued wrestling for the company, while also participating in their talent exchange with the Japanese company Big Japan Pro Wrestling. Canady won the CZW Iron Man Championship on June 9, but lost it the following September. During his time with the company, Canady was made an honorary member of the stable the H8 Club.

Big Japan Pro Wrestling (2000–2008)
Canady begin wrestling in Big Japan Pro Wrestling in 2000 as a part of the talent exchange between the company and Combat Zone Wrestling. He wrestled singles matches under the name Original Foolish Foreigner before changing his name back to Mad Man Pondo. The talent exchange between the companies stopped in 2001 when Combat Zone Wrestling demanded more money. Big Japan Pro Wrestling refused, so CZW pulled all of their talent from Japan. Canady, however, refused to leave because the fans and the company treated him well.

He was later named the American booker for Big Japan Pro Wrestling and brought in talent from the states, including 2 Tuff Tony. He and Tony soon formed the tag team Baka Gaijin, Japanese for Stupid Foreigners. The team was well received by both the Japanese crowd and the Japanese wrestlers. They continued to wrestle multiple tours together from 2001 to 2006, while Canady continued singles tours until 2008.

Other Promotions

Horror Slam Wrestling 
On February 16, 2018 Madman Pondo teamed with Leatherface & Freddie Kreuger to defeat Breyer Wellington, Giuseppe Colonna, & Isiah Broner in his first appearance at Horror Slam Wrestling in Riverview, Michigan. On October 19, 2018 Adam Rose defeated Madman Pondo. On December 14, 2018 Madman Pondo & Chuck Stein defeated Jeff King & Peter B. Beautiful in a Deathmatch. On July 19, 2019 Madman Pondo & Chuck Stein fought to a No Contest in a Deathmatch. 

On August 9, 2019 Madman Pondo defeated Chuck Stein to win the Horror Slam Deathmatch Title in Riverview, Michigan On September 20, 2019 Chuck Stein defeated Madman Pondo to win back the Horror Slam Deathmatch Title in Lincoln Park, Michigan. On October 18, 2019 Kongo Kong (with Heidi Katrina) defeated Madman Pondo (with Sabrina Hexx) by DQ. On November 22, 2019 Madman Pondo defeated Percy Drews.

RPW (Ruthless Pro Wrestling) 
On October 10, 2020 Madman Pondo defeated Poindexter in Erie, Michigan

Game Changer Wrestling 
On January 30, 2021 
Madman Pondo defeated Jeff Cannonball at Game Changer Wrestling "UV:60" as part of GCW's Fight Forever 24-hour live stream of wrestling.

Total Kaos Wrestling 
On March 20, 2021
Madman Pondo participated in TKW (Total Kaos Wrestling) "Kaos Kup" Deathmatch Tournament in Taylor, Michigan.
Madman Pondo defeated Peter B. Beautiful to win the AIWF World Deathmatch Title in the tournament, but lost the title to Sean Lawhorn in a subsequent match.

Other media
Canady hosted his own Public-access television show in the late nineties. The program, which featured nude women, cursing, and wrestling, attracted the attention of television personality Jerry Springer. First being brought in to portray several different guests on Springer's The Jerry Springer Show, Canaday was later hired to find actors to appear as guests on the show. In 2005, he appeared in director Tim Sullivan's horror movie 2001 Maniacs as the town's blacksmith. As Mad Man Pondo, Canady is a playable character in the video games Backyard Wrestling: Don't Try This at Home, Backyard Wrestling 2: There Goes the Neighborhood, and Fire Pro Wrestling Returns.

In 2018 Mad Man Pondo released his autobiography Memoirs of a Mad Man, published by Eat Sleep Wrestle, LLC.

Championships and accomplishments
Allied Independent Wrestling Federations
 AIWF World Deathmatch Championship (1 time) 
All Star Wrestling
ASW Tag Team Championship (1 time) – with The Juggulator
Ballistic Championship Wrestling
Brink of Death Deathmatch Tournament (2007)
Combat Zone Wrestling
CZW Iron Man Championship (1 time)
Destination 1 Wrestling'
D1W Championship (3 times)
Dramatic Dream Team
Ironman Heavymetalweight Championship (1 time)
Eastern Wrestling Alliance
EWA National Champion (1 time)
Horror Slam Wrestling
Horror Slam Deathmatch Championship (1 time) 
Independent Championship Wrestling
ICW Heavyweight Championship (1 time)
Independent Wrestling Association East-Coast
Fighting Ultimate Crazy King’s Championship (2 times)
Independent Wrestling Association Mid-South
IWA Mid-South Hardcore Championship (2 times)
IWA Mid-South Heavyweight Championship (1 time)
IWA Mid-South Tag Team Championship (1 time) – with Ian Rotten
IWA Mid-South King of the Deathmatch Tournament winner (2003)
IWA Mid-South Double Death Tag Team Tournament winner (2006) – with 2 Tuff Tony
Insane Wrestling Federation
IWF Cruiserweight Championship (1 time)
Juggalo Championship Wrestling
JCW Heavyweight Championship (2 times)
JCW Legends Title (1 time, current)
JCW Tag Team Championship (3 times) - with Necro Butcher (2) and Crazy Mary Dobson (1)
Lunatic Wrestling Federation
LWF Hardcore Champion (1 time)
MAD Pro Wrestling
MPW Heavyweight Championship (1 time)
Michigan Championship Wrestling
NSWA Hardcore Championship (1 time)
Mid-American Wrestling
MAW Hardcore Cup (2000)
NWA West Virginia/Ohio
NWA West Virginia/Ohio Hardcore Championship (1 time)
Ohio Valley Wrestling
OVW Southern Tag Team Championship (1 time) – with Dapper Dan Van Zandt
Pro Wrestling IRON
IRON Television Champion (1 time)
Real Deal Pro Wrestling
RDPW Street Fight Championship (1 time)
Resistance Pro Wrestling
RPW Tag Team Championship (2 times) - with Jay Bradley (1) and Shane Mercer (1)
Sex and Violence Wrestling
Sick F*ck Championship (1 time)
Stricktly Nsane Pro Wrestling
SNPW Heavyweight Championship (1 time)
SNPW Tag Team Championship (1 time, current) - with Cash Borden
Tri-State Wrestling
Tri-State Tag Team Championship (1 time) – with Tommy Lee Sledge
Westside Xtreme Wrestling
wXw Hardcore Champion (1 time)
World Entertainment Wrestling
WEW Six-Man Tag Team Championship (1 time) – with 2 Tuff Tony and Kintaro Kanemura
Xtreme Championship Wrestling
XCW Pro Wrestling Heavyweight Champion (1 time)
XCW Wrestling Mid-West
XCW Mid-West Heavyweight Championship (1 time)
XCW Mid-West Heavyweight Championship Tournament (2010)

References

External links

Official IWA East Coast website

1969 births
20th-century professional wrestlers
21st-century professional wrestlers
American male professional wrestlers
Living people
Professional wrestlers from Illinois
People from Flora, Illinois
Ironman Heavymetalweight Champions
WEW 6-Man Tag Team Champions